Zahl or Sahl is a Nordland family belonging to and mainly living in the County of Nordland, Norway. The family arrived there in the 17th century. Traditionally, members of the family have been traders, shippers, and sheriffs.

History 
The family immigrated from Denmark to Norway in the 17th century with Niels Jensen Zahl (Saell), District Stipendiary Magistrate in the 1620s and residing in Vadsø. The family's geographical origin is uncertain. Several villages named Sahl/Sall in Denmark are presented as likely possibilities.

Family members have been traders and shippers, and some have as sheriffs held local police authority. Among trade seats related to the family are Kjerringøy and Nordvika in Dønna.

Among prominent members of the family is Erasmus B.K. Zahl (1826–1900), a wealthy trader and an island owner in Kjerringøy. In the late 1800s, he gave financial support to Knut Hamsun, then a young and poor author. Later, Hamsun—a 1920 Nobel Literature Prize laureate—used Zahl as a model for the famous character Mack appearing in many of his novels, among others Pan (1894).

Anders Nicolai Zahl (1807–1857) of the Nordvika branch married Lorentze Sophie Lie, née Krogh (b. 1797), a daughter of Mathias Bonsach Krogh, bishop of Hålogaland.

Name 
Whilst the name in the aspect of orthography is identical with the German word Zahl, which means digit or number, its etymological origin remains unknown or unconfirmed. Among other spellings are Sahl, Saell, and Zal. As the name has been inherited also from mothers through generations, and this to a large extent, the group of past and present name bearers belong to various patrilineally defined families. The two most important branches are that whose paternal line descends from shipper Tomas of Sund in Leirfjord and that whose paternal line descends from trader Hans Olsen Zahl of Nordvika in Dønna. Erasmus Zahl belonged to the latter.

Additional information from ancectry.com: 
Surname Zahl, German: from a reduced form of Middle High German zagel ‘tail’ or from a reduced form of a compound name formed with this element, as for example Hasenzahl (‘hare’s tail’). Jewish (Ashkenazic): from the Yiddish personal name Tsal, a pet form of the Biblical name Betzalel. Jewish (Ashkenazic): from German Zahl ‘number’.

See also 
 Erasmus Zahl
 Nordland families

References

Literature 
 Meyer, Anton Zahl: Leines Landet i Leirfjord – Landet, folket og historien 2007.
 NRK.no: Nordland fylkesleksikon: Zahl på Kjerringøy
 Store norske leksikon: Kjerringøy handelssted at snl.no
 Norsk biografisk leksikon: Knut Hamsun at snl.no

Norwegian families